"Here Is Gone" is a song by American rock band Goo Goo Dolls. A song about yearning for a deeper relationship with someone, "Here Is Gone" was released on March 11, 2002, as the lead single from the band's seventh studio album, Gutterflower (2002). It reached number 18 on the US Billboard Hot 100 chart and number three on the Adult Top 40. The single also reached number 17 in New Zealand, becoming the group's second top-20 hit there.

Writing and composition
Frontman John Rzeznik said the single is "kind of a cynical track about a very casual relationship where you just want something more." He explained that living 3,000 miles away from home while being single and "trying to figure things out is pretty much what was going on in this process."

Music video
The video, directed by Francis Lawrence, portrays a somewhat vague story with multiple interpretations, from a literal visitation of spirits to figurative rebellion against fully "constructed" society. During a commentary the band did on the music video in 2008, bassist Robby Takac described what the video was to portray: "the idea was we were going to go through an entire day in a very short amount of time." The video shoot took place mostly in Lancaster, California.

Track listings

US 7-inch single
A. "Here Is Gone" (album version) – 4:00
B. "Big Machine" (album version) – 3:10

UK CD1
 "Here Is Gone" – 3:57
 "We Are the Normal" – 3:56
 "Burnin' Up" – 2:33
 "Here Is Gone" (video) – 4:01

UK CD2
 "Here Is Gone" – 3:57
 "Two Days in February" – 3:12
 "Girl Right Next to Me" – 3:43

European CD single
 "Here Is Gone" – 3:57
 "We Are the Normal" – 3:56

Australian CD single
 "Here Is Gone" – 3:57
 "We Are the Normal" – 3:36
 "Burnin' Up" – 2:32
 "Two Days in February" – 3:12

Personnel
Personnel are taken from the UK CD1 liner notes.
 John Rzeznik – writing
 Rob Cavallo, Goo Goo Dolls – production
 Allen Sides, Ken Allardyce – engineering
 Tom Lord-Alge – mixing

Charts

Weekly charts

Year-end charts

Certifications

Release history

References

2002 singles
Goo Goo Dolls songs
Music videos directed by Francis Lawrence
Song recordings produced by Rob Cavallo
Songs about heartache
Songs written by John Rzeznik
Warner Records singles